Anthony Sanchez, Antonio Sanchez or Tony Sanchez may refer to:

Sports
 Antón (footballer) (1914–2005), Spanish footballer born Antonio Sánchez Valdés
 Antonio Sánchez (boxer) (1905–?), Spanish boxer
 Antonio Sánchez (footballer, born 1997), Spanish footballer
 Antonio Sánchez (sprinter) (born 1963), Spanish sprinter
 Tony Sanchez (American football) (born 1974), American football coach
 Toni Sánchez (born 1985), Spanish footballer
 Tony Sanchez (baseball) (born 1988), American baseball player

Music
 Antonio Sánchez Pecino (1908–1994), Spanish guitarist
 Antonio Sánchez (drummer) (born 1971), Mexican drummer
 Tony Sánchez-Ohlsson (born 1974), Spanish music producer
 Antonio José Sánchez Mazuecos (born 1995), Spanish singer

Politics
 Antonio Sánchez de Bustamante y Sirven (1865–1951), Cuban politician and lawyer
 Tony Sanchez Jr. (born 1943), American businessman and former gubernatorial candidate
 Antonio Sanchez (politician) (died 2021), Filipino mayor involved in a rape-murder
 Antonio Sánchez Díaz de Rivera (born 1953), Mexican politician

Other
 Antonio Sanchez Araujo (1887–1946), Cuban painter
 Antonio Sánchez (Puerto Rican host) (born 1961), Puerto Rican radio and television personality
 Antonio Sanchez (politician) (1949–2021), former mayor of Calauan, Laguna
 Tony Sanchez (photographer) (died 2000), English photographer